Joshua D. Peters is an American politician in the Democratic Party who was the Missouri State Representative of Missouri's 76th District from 2013 to 2019. Peters was first elected in a special election on April 2, 2013. He represented portions of north Saint Louis City. At the time of his election, he was the youngest African American ever elected to the Missouri House of Representatives. In 2016 Peters served as the House Minority Chief Deputy Whip.

Early career
Peters served as a legislative assistant and office manager to Congressman Lacy Clay of Missouri's 1st congressional district for three years and was appointed by President Barack Obama as the Confidential Assistant to the Under Secretary of Education, Martha Kanter. where he assisted in the creation and establishment of the 'Financial Aid Shopping Sheet,' offering college-bound students a resource to understand the type and level of financial aid they qualified for.

Missouri Legislature

As a democrat in a supermajority republican led legislator, Peters successfully pass ten Bills and countless amendments and focused on constituent services. After learning about 18 fatal crashes, including 13 involving pedestrians, on Natural Bridge Avenue in the city of St. Louis. Peters successfully secured 7 million dollars to launch the Missouri Department of Transportation, Natural Bridge Safety Initiative.  Peters and MoDOT partnered with St. Louis Metropolitan Police Dept. and six St. Louis Aldermen to designate a 4-mile segment of Natural Bridge between Goodfellow and Parnell, a Travel Safe Zone. In 2016, Peters secured state funding for Lincoln University's 1890 Land-grant, which had not been appropriated by the state legislature since 1866. Peters stated, "Lincoln University is our state's most diverse institution and performs agricultural research that is vital to rural Missouri," Peters said. "It is well past time for Lincoln to be treated fairly and receive its full land-grant appropriation."

On April 24, 2017, Peters, along with Missouri State Representative Bruce Franks Jr., filed a housing discrimination complaint to the United States Department of Housing and Urban Development. The case alleged that a concentration of facilities serving homeless people created a strong disparity within St. Louis City's Near Northside.

In addition to his official duties, Peters remained active within his party on April 5, 2017, he was appointed as the first congressional designee to the executive board of the Missouri Democratic Party.

House committees
As a member of the Missouri House, Peters served on the following committees:
International Trade
Government Efficiency, Ranking Minority Member
Budget
Professional Registration and Licensing
Agriculture Policy
Appropriations-Public Safety and Correction
Special Committee on Urban Issues
Subcommittee on Appropriations - Agriculture, Conservation, Natural Resources, and Economic Development
Subcommittee on Scope of Practice

Affiliations
Peters is a member of Kappa Alpha Psi fraternity and serves as a member of the board of directors of the Missouri Arts Council Trust, the Congressional Black Associates, Pi Sigma Alpha, a Thurgood Marshall Scholar (09), the U.S. Selective Service, Logan University, and the Betty Jean Kerr People's Health Center of St. Louis. Peters holds the rank of Major of Civil Air Patrol U.S. Air Force Auxiliary. Peters retired from public office after being involved in a car accident, which left him incapacitated for three months of the legislative session. Peters is currently the Chief of Staff and Director of Internal Operations of Harris-Stowe State University.

Peters is a Catholic by faith and practice.

Elections

Political offices

References

External links
 Official Missouri House of Representatives profile
 Personal Website
 Profile at Project Vote Smart
 Profile at Ballotpedia

1987 births
Living people
Democratic Party members of the Missouri House of Representatives
African-American Catholics
Politicians from St. Louis
African-American state legislators in Missouri
Catholics from Missouri
21st-century African-American people
20th-century African-American people